The Washington Senators was one of eight teams of the United States Baseball League. The league folded after just over a month of play in 1912. The Senators were owned by Hugh McKinnon and managed by George Browne.

1912 Standings 

In the USBL's only year, the Senators finished fifth place at 6-7, playing the fewest games of any team. The first game they played was on May 1, against Richmond, a 2-0 loss before 9,000 fans. It is one of the few known results of any of the USBL teams. Washington finished 6—7 and 5th in the league.

Roster

References

External links
  Stats at baseball-reference

 
United States Baseball League teams
Defunct baseball teams in Washington, D.C.
Baseball teams disestablished in 1912
Baseball teams established in 1912